Aleksey Aleksandrovich Isayev (born 9 November 1995) is a professional footballer who plays for Sabah FK in the Azerbaijan Premier League. Born in Russia, he represents the Azerbaijan national team.

Club career 
He made his debut in the Russian Football National League for FC Yenisey Krasnoyarsk on 30 September 2014 in a game against FC Dynamo Saint Petersburg.

On 26 June 2018, Isayev signed a two-year contract with Sumgayit FK.

On 9 July 2020, Isayev signed a three-year contract with Sabah FK.

International career
He made his debut for Azerbaijan national football team on 24 March 2021 in a World Cup qualifier against Portugal.

Career statistics

Club

International

International goals

References

External links
 
 
 Profile by Russian Football National League

1995 births
Living people
Sportspeople from Krasnoyarsk
Citizens of Azerbaijan through descent
Azerbaijani footballers
Azerbaijan international footballers
Russian footballers
Russian sportspeople of Azerbaijani descent
Association football midfielders
Azerbaijan Premier League players
FC Yenisey Krasnoyarsk players
FC Zenit-2 Saint Petersburg players
Sumgayit FK players
Sabah FC (Azerbaijan) players
FC Zenit Saint Petersburg players